Kirti Gupta  is an Indian sport shooter. She won a silver medal at the ISSF World Cup shotgun in Cairo in the team trap shooting along with Manisha Keer and Rajeshwari Kumari.

References

2001 births
Living people
Indian female sport shooters